The National Museum of Catholic Art and History is a museum in Washington, D.C., focusing on Catholic art. It was formerly located in East Harlem, Manhattan, New York City. It was founded by Christina Cox in 1995.

History 
Cox opened the first Catholic museum in the United States after receiving a standard  blessing from then-Pope John Paul II. The museum has received support from the Archdiocese of New York although there is no connection between the two. Following controversy regarding the museum's status as a charity and its collection of funds, the archdiocese sought unsuccessfully to have the word "Catholic" removed from the museum's name.

The museum's collection aims to cover the many facets of Catholic art, although in 2003 Joseph Berger wrote that it lacked a unifying theme, relying instead on donated works.

The museum's original location was in the Olympic Towers on Fifth Avenue, near St. Patrick's Cathedral, a location that allowed the museum to take advantage of Christmas celebrations in the neighborhood. The museum moved several times, including to locations near Radio City Music Hall.  In 2002, faced with increasing rents, the museum moved to E. 115th Street, the former home of Our Lady of Mount Carmel Shrine which had recently been spared significant damage from a fire. The museum received around four million dollars in grants from New York State, in the hopes that it would help revitalize East Harlem.

The museum was credited with helping to shape and develop the so-called "new Harlem" that was evolving as a result of increased money and the gentrification of the neighborhood. Following an $8 million renovation, the museum also planned an exhibit on the history of East Harlem, acknowledging the role of the church that housed it in the formerly Italian neighborhood that is now known as Spanish Harlem.

The museum announced on 17 May 2010 that it was closing, and hoped to move to Washington, D.C. On January 27, 2012 the museum filed Chapter 7 bankruptcy (liquidation) in the Southern District of New York as case number 12-10331. The Voluntary Petition listed assets of less than $50,000 and liabilities of $1 million to $10 million.

In 2012 the museum began moving to its new location on Massachusetts Avenue in Washington D.C.  Since 2011, it has solicited contributions to re-open   the museum has not re-opened or announced a date for re-opening.

Collections
The museum has 11 galleries of art and artifacts, including traveling exhibits and works on art on loan by private collectors. The collection of old masters includes "The Betrayal of Christ" by Anthony van Dyck. The contemporary galleries have a permanent exhibition called "The Morsel "(Last Supper) by Paul A. Gatto, "The Blue Madonna", as well as works by Andy Warhol, Robert Rauschenberg. The museum's Catholic history galleries describe the voyage of Christopher Columbus to the New World, the success of the United States Declaration of Independence in an 8 ft oil painting by Russian-born portrait painter Victor Korolev and his portrait of Archbishop John Carroll. The permanent collection includes a life-size Nativity of Jesus from the Philippines.

See also
History of Roman Catholicism in the United States
Roman Catholicism in the United States

References

External links
 
 

1995 establishments in the United States
Art museums established in 1995
Art museums and galleries in Washington, D.C.
Catholic Church in the United States
Defunct museums in New York City
East Harlem
Religious museums in the United States
Catholic art